Feedback is an EP by Canadian rock band Rush, released in 2004. The record features eight covers of songs that were influential for the band members during the 1960s. The outing marked the 30th anniversary of the release of Rush's debut album, which featured the original lineup of Geddy Lee, Alex Lifeson and John Rutsey. The tour in support of the Feedback album was called the R30: 30th Anniversary Tour. The record was remastered and reissued in 2013 as a part of the box set The Studio Albums 1989–2007. In 2016 it was reissued after being remastered by Sean Magee at Abbey Road Studios following a direct approach by Rush to remaster their entire back catalogue.

Critical reception 

Rhapsody praised the EP, calling it one of their favourite cover releases. AllMusic reviewer Thom Jurek called the track list "amazing" and said "None of these tunes are done with an ounce of camp. What the listener encounters is a Rush that has never ever been heard before."

Track listing

Personnel
 Geddy Lee – lead vocals, bass guitar
 Alex Lifeson – guitar
 Neil Peart – drums, percussion

Singles

Charts

References

2004 EPs
Rush (band) albums
Anthem Records EPs
Atlantic Records EPs
Albums produced by David Leonard (record producer)
Covers EPs